The Roman Catholic Diocese of Montenegro is a suffragan Latin diocese in the Ecclesiastical province of its mother see, the Metropolitan Archdiocese of Porto Alegre (in the state capital) in Rio Grande do Sul state, southernmost Brazil.

Its cathedral episcopal see is Catedral de São João Batista, dedicated to John the Baptist in the city of Montenegro, Brazil.

Statistics 
As per 2014, it pastorally served 285,590 Catholics (76.0% of 375,589 total) on 4,385 km² in 30 parishes with 49 priests (39 diocesan, 10 religious), 4 deacons, 148 lay religious (24 brothers, 124 sisters) and 18 seminarians.

History 
The diocese was erected by Pope Benedict XVI on 2 July 2008, on territory split off from its Metropolitan see, the Archdiocese of Porto Alegre.

Bishops

Episcopal ordinaries
 Paulo Antônio de Conto (born Brazil) (2 July 2008 - 18 October 2017), also Apostolic Administrator of Passo Fundo (Brazil) (2015.07.15 – 2015.12.02); previously Bishop of São Luíz de Caceres (Brazil) (1991.07.24 – 1998.05.27), Bishop of Criciúma (Brazil) (1998.05.27 – 2008.07.02)
 Carlos Rômulo Gonçalves e Silva (18 October 2017 - ...); previously Coadjutor Bishop (2017.03.22 – 2017.10.18), neither previous prelature nor titular see.

Coadjutor bishop
Carlos Rômulo Gonçalves e Silva (2017)

See also 
 List of Catholic dioceses in Brazil

References

Sources and external links 
 GCatholic, with Google map & satellite photo - data for all sections

Roman Catholic dioceses in Brazil
Christian organizations established in 2008
Roman Catholic Ecclesiastical Province of Porto Alegre
Roman Catholic dioceses and prelatures established in the 21st century
2008 establishments in Brazil